The 1980–81 UC Irvine Anteaters men's basketball team represented the University of California, Irvine during the 1980–81 NCAA Division I men's basketball season. The Anteaters were led by first year head coach Bill Mulligan and played their home games at the Crawford Hall. They were members of the Pacific Coast Athletic Association. They finished the season 17–10 and 9–5 in PCAA play.

Previous season 
The 1979–80 Anteaters finished the season with a record of 9–18 and 1–13 in PCAA play. Coach Tim Tift announced his resignation as coach of the anteaters with 6 games remaining in the season. Saddleback College coach Bill Mulligan was announced as the new coach on March 1.

Off-season

Incoming transfers

1980 recruiting class
Source:

Roster

Schedule

|-
!colspan=9 style="background:#002244; color:#FFDE6C;"| Non-Conference Season

|-
!colspan=9 style="background:#002244; color:#FFDE6C;"| Conference Season

|-
!colspan=9 style="background:#002244; color:#FFDE6C;"| PCAA tournament

Source

Awards and honors
Kevin Magee
AP First Team All-American
PCAA Player of the Year 
PCAA First Team All-Conference 
Ben McDonald
PCAA Freshman of the Year 
PCAA All-Freshman Team

References

UC Irvine Anteaters men's basketball seasons
Uc Irvine
UC Irvine Anteaters
UC Irvine Anteaters